Extracellular matrix protein FRAS1 is a protein that in humans is encoded by the FRAS1 (Fraser syndrome 1) gene. This gene encodes an extracellular matrix protein that appears to function in the regulation of epidermal-basement membrane adhesion and organogenesis during development.

Metastatic prostate cancer 

A single nucleotide switch (polymorphism) in FRAS1 promoter region is associated with metastatic Prostate cancer. The promoter region is directly related to the NFkB pathway and has been shown to be associated with lethal prostate cancer. 

Fras1 related extracellular matrix (FREM1) directly relates to congenital diaphragmatic hernia in developing fetuses. Decreased expression of FREM1 may be linked with disruptions in the growth of diaphragm cells. Both FRAS1 and FREM1 are among the proteins that are primarily interacting during embryonic development. It is shown that a decrease in these two proteins lead to an increase of  congenital diaphragmatic hernia in both humans and mice.

Clinical significance 
Mutations in this gene have been observed to cause fraser syndrome.

See also 
 Fraser syndrome

References

Further reading 

 
 
 
 
 
 
 
 
 
 

Extracellular matrix proteins